St. Paul Station may refer to several transport stops:

France
Saint-Paul (Paris Métro)

United Kingdom
St Paul's tube station on the London Underground
St Pauls railway station (Halifax) (closed 1960)
St Paul's tram stop, Birmingham
Walsall St Pauls bus station, West Midlands
City Thameslink railway station on the Thameslink core route in London, formerly known as St. Paul's Thameslink.

United States
St. Paul station (DART), Dallas, Texas
St. Paul Street station (MBTA Green Line B branch), Massachusetts
St. Paul Street station (MBTA Green Line C branch), Massachusetts
Saint Paul Union Depot, Saint Paul, Minnesota